Pálffy or Palffy is a Hungarian surname which means "son of Pál (Paul)". The family name is common in Hungary and Slovakia.

Pálffy ab Erdöd noble family
The most famous bearers of the name Pálffy are the members of the Austro-Hungarian noble family Pálffy ab Erdöd. Family members include:

Paul Pálffy ab Erdöd (1580/1589–1653), Palatine of Hungary, Knight of the Golden Fleece
Johann Bernhard Stephan, Graf Pálffy ab Erdöd (1664–1751), Imperial field marshal, Palatine of Hungary, Knight of the Golden Fleece
Nikolaus VI Graf Pálffy ab Erdöd (1657/67–1732), Imperial field marshal and Palatine of Hungary, Knight of the Golden Fleece
Lipót Pálffy de Erdőd (1764–1825), Major General
Ferdinand Palffy von Erdöd (1774–1840), mining engineer in the Austrian Empire and Vienna Theatre manager
Fidél Pálffy (1895–1946), Hungarian nobleman who was a leading supporter of Nazism in Hungary

Other people named Pálffy
Other notable people with the surname include:

Žigmund Pálffy (born 1972), Slovak ice hockey player
David Palffy (born 1969), Canadian actor of Hungarian extraction
Zsuzsanna Pálffy (born 1970), Hungarian handball player
Géza Pálffy (born 1971), Hungarian historian

See also
Pálffy Palace (disambiguation)

Hungarian-language surnames